Father and Guns is a Canadian comedy film originating from Quebec that was released in 2009. Directed by Émile Gaudreault, the film stars Michel Côté and Louis-José Houde as Jacques and Marc Laroche, feuding father and son police officers who are forced to re-evaluate their relationship when they are paired up on an undercover assignment in a father-son adventure therapy camp.

The film's cast also includes Caroline Dhavernas, Rémy Girard, Robin Aubert, Pierre Collin and Patrick Drolet.

The film took in over $11 million at the box office, becoming the highest-grossing French-language film in Canadian history. A sequel film, Father and Guns 2 (De père en flic 2), was released in 2017.

Awards
The film was named the winner of the Golden Reel Award, for highest-grossing Canadian film of the year, at the 30th Genie Awards. Girard and Drolet also garnered Best Supporting Actor nominations, and Gaudreault and Ian Lauzon were nominated for Best Original Screenplay.

References

External links
 

2009 films
2000s French-language films
Canadian comedy films
Films directed by Émile Gaudreault
2009 comedy films
French-language Canadian films
2000s Canadian films